United Nations Security Council Resolution 207, adopted unanimously on August 10, 1965, after a receiving report by the Secretary-General stating that recent developments in Cyprus had increased tension on the island, the Council reaffirmed its Resolution 186 and called upon all parties to avoid any action which would be likely to worsen the situation.

See also
Cyprus dispute
List of United Nations Security Council Resolutions 201 to 300 (1965–1971)

References

Text of the Resolution at undocs.org

External links
 

 0207
 0207
1965 in Cyprus
August 1965 events